Grevillea nana, commonly known as dwarf grevillea, is a species of flowering plant in the family Proteaceae and is endemic to the south-west of Western Australia. It is a prostrate to low, mounded, dense shrub with divided leaves with sharply-pointed, linear lobes, and clusters of pink, orange, yellow or red flowers.

Description

Taxonomy
Grevillea nana was first formally described in 1943 by Charles Gardner in the Journal of the Royal Society of Western Australia from specimens collected by William Blackall between Koorda and Bencubbin. The specific epithet (nana) means "dwarf".

In 1986, Donald McGillivray described two subspecies of G. nana in his book, New Names in Grevillea (Proteaceae), and the names are accepted by the Australian Plant Census:

Distribution and habitat
Subspecies nana grows in open heath and shrubland from near Bullfinch to Mount Gibson and Manmanning in the Avon Wheatbelt, Coolgardie, Murchison and Yalgoo bioregions of south-western Western Australia..

Conservation status
Subspecies nana is listed as "not threatened" but subspecies abbreviata is listed as "Priority Two" by the Western Australian Government Department of Biodiversity, Conservation and Attractions, meaning that it is poorly known and from only one or a few locations.

References

nana
Proteales of Australia
Flora of Western Australia
Taxa named by Charles Gardner
Plants described in 1943